Paolo da Novi (Novi Ligure, 1440Genoa, 10 July 1507) was the 42nd Doge of the Republic of Genoa.

Biography 
A native of Novi Ligure, he moved to Genoa with his family where he worked as a silk dyer. At the end of the fifteenth century he was appointed to the Office of the Authority, which was followed by his appointment as captain for the defense of the Riviere.

In his short Dogate, which lasted 17 days, as a wise and prudent man, he tried to promote reforms in favor of the people and peaceful coexistence. And to restore the state coffers he also took out a mortgage with Bank of Saint George.

See also 
 Doge of Genoa
 Republic of Genoa

References 

16th-century Doges of Genoa
1440 births
1507 deaths